George Edward Watts (1786 – December 2, 1860) commanded a Royal Navy ship during the War of 1812.

He was born in Halifax, Nova Scotia, the son of John Watts and Agnes Skene,  and entered the Royal Navy in 1797. He served in Halifax, the West Indies and the North Sea. Watts commanded HMS Jaseur during the War of 1812, capturing more than 30 ships. He was promoted to captain in 1814, to Rear-admiral in 1849 and to Vice-Admiral in 1856. In 1820, he married Jane Waldie.

Watts died at Malvern at the age of 74.  He is commemorated in the Admiralty Garden in CFB Halifax.

Further reading
 
 Our roots
 James Naval History. Vol. 4. p. 204, 244-5, vol 6 p. 109

References 

1786 births
1860 deaths
Canadian people of the War of 1812
Persons of National Historic Significance (Canada)
Royal Navy officers